The Kreutzer Air Coach is an American-built light trimotor transport aircraft of the late 1920s.

Design and development

Joseph Kreutzer formed the company of the same name in Los Angeles in late 1928. In 1929 the firm moved to Clover Field, Santa Monica, California, occupying the former Bach aircraft factory.  Kreutzer was joined by Lawrence Brown and Albin Peterson who had designed the Brown-Mercury C-2.

Kreutzer developed a series of small high-winged trimotor light transport aircraft, naming each the Air Coach.  Each had a fixed tailwheel undercarriage with the two outboard engined slung from the supporting bracing struts to the high wing. The first model was the K-1 Air Coach of late 1928 which was powered by three  Velie engines and accommodated four persons. The sole example NX71E first flew on 5 December 1928.  It was later fitted with a single  J6-9 engine and a hopper for agricultural purposes.  It crashed at Yuba City California in 1936.

The next Air Coach was the K-2 of 1929 which had a similar wing span but was lengthened by five feet to permit six persons to be carried. The K-2 was fitted with one  and two  LeBlond engines. Four examples were built. The K-3 was similar to the K-2 but was fitted with three  LeBlond engines. Two were built and two earlier machines converted to this standard. The K-4 designation was not used.

The K-5 Air Coach, also of 1929, had similar dimensions to the K-2 and K-3 but was fitted with three  five-cylinder Kinner K-5 engines. The extra power enabled heavier loads to be carried and in addition to eight new-build aircraft, one earlier aircraft was converted to this standard.

Kreutzer's operations were suspended in 1931 and no further development was undertaken.  The firm was reorganized as the Air Transport Manufacturing Co in 1935 and a T-6 design was developed, but no production materialised.

Operational history
The Air Coach series of aircraft were used by small air transport operators in the United States and in Mexico. At least one was modified for agricultural aviation and others were latterly acquired by private owners. The design featured a heated and ventilated cabin and shatterproof glass glazing.

The sole survivor N612A was originally a K-2, but was upgraded to K-3 and then to K-5 standard. It was sold to Mexico in 1931 as XB-AHO and was flown by La Compania Aeronautica De La Sierra on routes from Parral to local silver and other mining operations in inaccessible territory. It carried equipment and personnel to the mines and valuable ores on the return journey. It was sold in 1939 for operations from Chihuahua. After becoming derelict, it was recovered using pack animals and is now maintained airworthy by the private Golden Wings Air Museum near Minneapolis Minnesota.

Variants
 K-1  3 x  Velie M-5 engines  Span 48' 6", length 28' 6" (1 built)
 K-2  1 x  and 2 x  LeBlond engines.  Span 48' 10", length 33' 6" (4 built)
 K-3  3 x  LeBlond TD engines. Dimensions as K-2 (2 built and 2 conversions)
 K-4  designation not used
 K-5  3 x  five cylinder Kinner K5 engines (8 built)
 T-6  3 x  five cylinder Kinner K5 engines
Air Transport T-6 Revived in 1935 by the General-Western Aero Corp Ltd.  and Air Transport Mfg Co.

Operators
 Navajo Airways, Arizona, USA;
 Wedell-Williams Air Service, Louisiana, USA

Specifications (K-5)

See also

Notes

References

1920s United States civil utility aircraft
Trimotors
High-wing aircraft
Air Coach
Aircraft first flown in 1928